Mycolicibacter longobardus (formerly Mycobacterium longobardum) is a species of bacteria from the phylum Actinomycetota. It is susceptible to sulfamethoxazole and clarithromycin. It has been associated with cases of osteomyelitis and an epidermal inclusion cyst of the hand,

References

Acid-fast bacilli
longobardus
Bacteria described in 2013